Classic Hot Tuna Acoustic is a Hot Tuna album released in 1996 and is an expansion of the A-side of the previous vinyl release Historic Live Tuna.  The B-side of the previous release was expanded as Classic Hot Tuna Electric and released at the same time as this album. The tracks are taken from a live acoustic performance played on KSAN radio in 1971.

Track listing
"Never Happen No More" (Blind Blake) – 6:08
"Candy Man" (Rev. Gary Davis) – 4:35
"New Song (for the Morning)" (Jorma Kaukonen) – 5:08
"Hesitation Blues" (Traditional) – 5:17
"Been So Long" (Kaukonen) – 4:22
"Oh Lord, Search My Heart" (Rev. Gary Davis) – 4:45
"Uncle Sam Blues" (Traditional) – 5:24
"Space Jam" (Jack Casady, Kaukonen) – 0:26
"True Religion" (Traditional) – 7:09
"Death Don't Have No Mercy" (Davis) – 9:58

Personnel
Jorma Kaukonen – acoustic guitar, vocals
Jack Casady – bass
Papa John Creach – violin
Sammy Piazza - drums

Production
Michael Falzarano – producer
Leslie D. Kippel – executive producer
Jorma Kaukonen archives – photography
Relix archives – photography

References

Hot Tuna live albums
1996 live albums
Relix Records live albums